"You Keep Me Hangin' On" is a song written and composed by Holland–Dozier–Holland. It was first recorded in 1966 by American Motown girl group the Supremes, reaching number one on the Billboard Hot 100. American rock band Vanilla Fudge released a cover version in June the following year, which reached number six on the Billboard Hot 100. English singer Kim Wilde covered "You Keep Me Hangin' On" in 1986, reaching number one on the Billboard Hot 100 in June 1987. In the first 32 years of the Billboard Hot 100 rock era, "You Keep Me Hangin' On" became one of the six songs to reach number one by two different musical acts. In 1996, American country singer Reba McEntire's version reached number two on the US Billboard Hot Dance Club Play chart. The BBC ranked the Supremes' original song at number 78 on The Top 100 Digital Motown Chart, which ranks Motown releases by their all-time UK downloads and streams.

The Supremes original version

Background
"You Keep Me Hangin' On" was originally recorded in 1966 by the Supremes for the Motown label. The single is rooted in proto-funk and rhythm and blues, compared to the Supremes' previous single, "You Can't Hurry Love", which uses the call and response elements akin to gospel. The song's signature guitar part is said to have originated from a Morse code-like radio sound effect, typically used before a news announcement, heard by Lamont Dozier. Dozier collaborated with Brian and Eddie Holland to integrate the idea into a single.

Many elements of the recording, including the guitars, the drums, and Diana Ross's vocals were multitracked, a production technique which was established and popularized concurrently by Holland–Dozier–Holland (H–D–H) and other premier producers of the 1960s such as Phil Spector (see Wall of Sound) and George Martin. H–D–H recorded the song in eight sessions with the Supremes and session band the Funk Brothers before settling on a version deemed suitable for the final release.

Reception
"You Keep Me Hangin' On" was the first single taken from the Supremes' 1967 album The Supremes Sing Holland–Dozier–Holland. The song became the group's eighth number-one single when it topped the Billboard Hot 100 pop singles chart for two weeks in the United States from November 19 to 26, 1966. It peaked at number eight in the UK Singles Chart. The Supremes original version was ranked number 339 on Rolling Stones The 500 Greatest Songs of All Time. It was voted number 43 on Detroit's 100 Greatest Songs, a Detroit Free Press poll in 2016.  Billboard described the song as a "pulsating rocker with the trio in top form" with an "interesting, driving guitar figure throughout."  Cash Box said that it is "another in [the Supremes'] long-line of strong 'Detroit' offerings" that "is bound to follow in footsteps of the group’s previous winners."

The track is one of the more oft-covered songs in the Supremes canon. The group performed the song on the ABC variety program The Hollywood Palace on October 29, 1966.

Personnel
 Diana Ross – lead vocals
 Florence Ballard – backing vocals
 Mary Wilson – backing vocals
 The Funk Brothers – instrumental accompaniment

Charts

Weekly charts

Year-end charts

Sales

|}

Vanilla Fudge version

Background
Vanilla Fudge's 1967 psychedelic rock remake entitled "You Keep Me Hanging On" reached number six on the Billboard Hot 100 chart a year after the release of the Supremes' recording. While the edited version released on the 45 RPM single was under three minutes long, the album version was 7:26. The recording, done in one take, was Vanilla Fudge's first single.

Vanilla Fudge drummer Carmine Appice talked about the band's decision to cover the song in a 2014 interview:

The Vanilla Fudge version appears in the series finale of the television show The Sopranos (2007), at the conclusion of episode 1 of season 7 of the television series Mad Men (2015), the film War Dogs (2016), the video game Mafia III (2016), the film Once Upon a Time in Hollywood (2019) and its soundtrack, and over the closing credits of the "Intervention" (2022) episode of That Damn Michael Che.

Personnel
Carmine Appice – drums, vocals
Tim Bogert – bass, vocals
Vince Martell – guitar, vocals
Mark Stein – lead vocals, keyboards

Charts

Kim Wilde version

Background
"You Keep Me Hangin' On" was covered in an updated version by English singer Kim Wilde in 1986. Wilde's version was a total re-working of the original, completely transforming the Supremes' Motown Sound into a hi-NRG song.

Reception
It was released as the second single from Wilde's fifth studio album, Another Step (although "You Keep Me Hangin' On" was the LP's first worldwide single, as the first single had been released only in selected countries). The song reached number two in Wilde's native United Kingdom, and number one in Australia. It also became Wilde's second and last top-40 entry in the United States following "Kids in America" (1981), as well as her most successful song in that country to date, reaching number one on the Billboard Hot 100 chart for one week in June 1987. It later ranked as the 34th best-selling song of 1987 on Billboards Hot 100 year-end chart that year. "You Keep Me Hangin' On" was certified silver by the British Phonographic Industry (BPI) for UK sales in excess of 250,000 copies.

In 2006, Wilde performed a new version of the song with German singer Nena for her Never Say Never album.

Music video
A music video was filmed to promote her single. Directed by Greg Masuak, the video shows Wilde in a dark room lying on a large bed. She then rises from the bed as she sings the song and finds herself being "threatened" by a strange man who is breaking down the walls around her.

Charts

Weekly charts

Year-end charts

Certifications

Reba McEntire version

American country singer Reba McEntire covered "You Keep Me Hangin' On" in 1995 for her twenty-second studio album, Starting Over (1996). Released as the album's fourth single in 1996 on MCA Nashville Records, it was co-produced by Tony Brown and Michael Omartian. Although not released to country radio, McEntire's rendition was her only dance hit, reaching number two on the US Billboard Hot Dance Club Play chart.

Reception
Larry Flick from Billboard wrote, "A Reba McEntire dance record? On paper, such an idea seems frighteningly incongruous. But in the hands of British production team Love To Infinity, the concept works like gangbusters. Playfully digging into the Supremes' pop classic, McEntire has a saucy style that is well-suited to the track's storm of bright pop/house percussion and sugary synths. Her country base may find this a tad hard to swallow, but it is so darn good that you'll be wishing for another romp in the disco round ASAP." Dan Glaister from The Guardian said songs like "You Keep Me Hanging On" are "safe, solid, and destined for a marketing megablitz. They're huge, but hardly country."

Track listing
 12" vinyl, 1996 (US)
A1. "You Keep Me Hangin' On" (Classic Paradise Mix) – 7:46
A2. "You Keep Me Hangin' On" (Classic Paradise Instrumental) – 7:47
B1. "You Keep Me Hangin' On" (Deep Love Mix) – 8:55
B2. "You Keep Me Hangin' On" (Aphrodisiac Mix) – 7:12

 CD maxi-single, 1996 (US)
"You Keep Me Hangin' On" (Classic Paradise Radio Mix) – 3:44
"You Keep Me Hangin' On" (Classic Paradise Mix) – 7:46
"You Keep Me Hangin' On" (Classic Paradise Instrumental) – 7:47
"You Keep Me Hangin' On" (Deep Love Mix) – 8:55
"You Keep Me Hangin' On" (Aphrodisiac Mix) – 7:12

Charts

Other cover versions
A lesser known cover was made by the famous Welsh singer Tom Jones, in his 1968 album The Tom Jones Fever Zone making him the third person to officially feature the song in one of his albums.

In 1969, Mary McCaslin released a cover version. According to New York Times: “transforms the tune from an urban teen-oriented lament into a mountain-flavored folk song of quiet, adult desperation.”

American vocalist, songwriter, guitarist, and producer Tim Buckley performed the song on his Dream Letter: Live in London 1968 album, which was released posthumously.  Rod Stewart recorded a cover version on his 1977 album Foot Loose & Fancy Free. Stewart's version featured drummer Carmine Appice, who's previous band, Vanilla Fudge, also recorded it. 

Dianna Agron as Quinn Fabray performed the song in the Glee episode "Throwdown". It was included on the soundtrack album Glee: The Music, Volume 1, which was nominated for a Grammy Award for Best Compilation Soundtrack for Visual Media. Raymund Flandez for The Wall Street Journal was critical of this cover, which he called "thin and jarring", while in 2015 The A.V. Club described it as "one of the best numbers in Glee history" and Mashable ranked it in the show's top 50 songs. The version peaked at number 166 on the UK Singles Chart for the week ending February 27, 2010.

The synth-pop band Colourbox covered the song for its self-titled album in 1985. The Kingston Whig-Standard music critic Greg Burliuk called the recording "the album's weakest track."

The British band Madness included a ska version of the song on their album The Dangermen Sessions Vol. 1 in 2005.

R&B singer Wilson Pickett recorded a version of the Vanilla Fudge cover on his 1970 Right On, and also released it as a single in 1969. Pickett's version reached number 16 on the US R&B chart and 92 on the Billboard Hot 100.

Jamaican singer Ken Boothe covered the song in 1968 on the b-side of a single.

See also
 List of Billboard Hot 100 number ones of 1966
 List of Billboard Hot 100 number ones of 1987

References

External links
 

1966 singles
1966 songs
1967 debut singles
1986 singles
1987 singles
1996 singles
Atco Records singles
Billboard Hot 100 number-one singles
Cashbox number-one singles
Grammy Hall of Fame Award recipients
Kim Wilde songs
MCA Nashville Records singles
MCA Records singles
Motown singles
Number-one singles in Australia
Number-one singles in Norway
Reba McEntire songs
RPM Top Singles number-one singles
Song recordings produced by Brian Holland
Song recordings produced by Lamont Dozier
Songs written by Holland–Dozier–Holland
The Supremes songs
Madness (band) songs
Vanilla Fudge songs